The Jacob Hamblin House is a historic residence and museum located in Santa Clara, Utah, United States (just west of St. George). Jacob Hamblin was a Mormon pioneer and missionary who founded Santa Clara in 1854. After a flood destroyed the town, a group of missionaries constructed a new home for him on a hillside. It is now open as a museum.

History

Jacob Hamblin was born in 1819 in Ashtabula County, Ohio. His family moved to Wisconsin in 1836, and got married three years later. In February 1842, Hamblin met a group of preachers of the Church of Jesus Christ of Latter-day Saints (the Church); only days later, he officially joined the Church. Church officials immediately recognized his leadership gifts and offered Hamblin the chance to join them in Nauvoo, Illinois. In 1844, the residents of Nauvoo were split over the issue of plural marriage, leading to the arrest of Joseph Smith, Jr. A believer in plural marriage, Hamblin took a second wife, Rachel Judd. A mob of men assassinated Smith while he was in jail, resulting in the succession crisis. Hamblin supported Brigham Young, the President of the Quorum of the Twelve Apostles, as President of the Church. Following growing anti-Mormon sentiment around Nauvoo, Hamblin migrated west with Young on the Mormon Trail.

Hamblin first settled in Tooele, Utah Territory, where he befriended several local Native Americans. His amicable relations with the natives did not go unnoticed—Brigham Young commissioned Hamblin to serve a mission to the Paiutes (believed by the Church members to be Lamanites). Serving the Paiutes was not only intended to spread the religion, but also to recruit soldiers for the anticipated Utah War. Hamblin moved to the southern reaches of the territory and founded the settlement of Santa Clara in 1854. After taking a group of Paiute to Salt Lake City (and taking another wife, Pricilla Leavitt), he encountered John D. Lee, who had just organized the Mountain Meadows massacre of the Baker-Fancher party. Horrified by the slaughter, Hamblin recovered all of the surviving children from the party and brought them back to Santa Clara. However, an 1897 account of the massacre by one of the 17 child survivors, Rebecca Dunlap Evins, identified Hamblin as "the only white man that she saw who belonged to the massacring party." She also saw white men disguised as Indians washing paint off their faces (Fort Smith, Ark., Elevator, August 20, 1897). Rebecca Dunlap was 6 at the time of the massacre of 120 emigrants, and she and two siblings were "rescued" (her word) from Hamblin two years after the massacre and returned to Arkansas.
  
A flood inundated the entire settlement of Santa Clara and forced the residents to construct new homes. Hamblin was away on mission at the time, but a group of missionaries were sent to the town to provide housing and care for his family. The John Hamblin home was completed later that year. Sandrock was quarried from hills near the home and was assembled by masons from Iron City. The two-story residence was built on a hillside, allowing access to the second floor from atop the hill. A porch on each floor stretches across the front (south end) of the house. Identical rooms were constructed on opposite ends of the house, to accommodate Hamblin's two wives, each with a fireplace and staircase to the second floor. Hamblin later married three other wives, who all moved into the residence. Hamblin was called to serve the Kanab region in 1871, and leased the house to a Mr. Bauman.

The Utah State Parks and Recreation Division repossessed the house in 1959 and converted it to a museum. With help from the LDS Church, 1860s replica furniture was provided for the house. Although Santa Clara features several early Mormon houses, the Jacob Hamblin House is the only one open to the public. Mormon missionaries provide free tours through the property.

See also

 National Register of Historic Places listings in Washington County, Utah

References

External links

 

National Register of Historic Places in Washington County, Utah
Houses on the National Register of Historic Places in Utah
Historic house museums in Utah
Museums in Washington County, Utah
Houses in Washington County, Utah
1863 establishments in Utah Territory